USS Chimango (AMc-42) was an Accentor-class coastal minesweeper acquired by the U.S. Navy for the dangerous task of removing mines from minefields laid in the water to prevent ships from passing.

The first ship to be named Chimango by the Navy, AMC-42 was launched 8 March 1941 by Gibbs Gas Engine Co., Jacksonville, Florida, and commissioned 3 June 1941.

World War II service 
 

From 2 August she operated off this new base laying buoys, taking part in minesweeping exercises, and recovering gear in Placentia Bay, until 5 October when she sailed for Casco Bay, Maine, and sweeping operations and patrols along the Maine coast. She also received aboard daily armed guard parties from merchant ships for instruction.

Inservice activities 

On 15 June 1942 she was decommissioned but placed in service, and continued to operate on minesweeping and patrol duty at New York and Charleston, South Carolina, until 20 December 1945.

Deactivation 

She was transferred to the Maritime Commission for disposal 21 August 1947.

References

External links 
 Dictionary of American Naval Fighting Ships
 NavSource Online: Mine Warfare Vessel Photo Archive - Chimango (AMc 42)

Accentor-class minesweepers
World War II minesweepers of the United States
Ships built in Jacksonville, Florida
1941 ships